The 1912 North Carolina gubernatorial election was held on November 5, 1912. Democratic nominee Locke Craig defeated Progressive nominee Iredell Meares with 61.35% of the vote.

General election

Candidates
Major party candidates
Locke Craig, Democratic
Thomas Settle, Republican

Other candidates
Iredell Meares, Progressive
H.E. Hodges, Socialist

Results

References

1912
North Carolina
Gubernatorial